The Battle of Fuengirola (15 October 1810) was an engagement between a small Army of the Duchy of Warsaw garrison of a medieval Moorish fortress in Fuengirola against a much larger Anglo-Spanish expeditionary corps under Andrew Blayney. Blayney led an amphibious assault on Sohail Castle under heavy bombardment. The defenders, fighting with the First French Empire, were men from the 4th Regiment of the Duchy of Warsaw. Under attack from sea and on land from the British and Spanish forces from the inland, about 300 Polish troops ultimately routed the assaulting forces, inflicting heavy losses on the British 89th Regiment of Foot, among other units, and capturing Blayney. Several of the Polish officers were subsequently awarded the Legion of Honour by Napoleon.

Background 

The town of Fuengirola has been an important trade town since the Middle Ages. To defend it against invasion from the sea, the Moors had built a stone castle on a hill between the Mediterranean and the Fuengirola River. During the Peninsular War the area of Costa del Sol was considered of secondary importance and was seized by the French forces with little opposition. Until 1810, partisan activity in the region was close to none. That is why, after suffering losses in the fights in the interior, some Polish units of the Duchy of Warsaw were sent there in October 1810 to serve as a garrison and to rest.

Sohail Castle was manned by 150 Polish soldiers from the 4th Infantry Regiment and 11 French dragoons. The unit was commanded by Captain Franciszek Młokosiewicz. Similar small garrisons were placed in the nearby towns of Mijas (60 infantrymen under Lieutenant Eustachy Chełmicki) and Alhaurin (200 infantrymen and 40 dragoons under Major Bronisz). All of these forces formed part of the French Corps of General Sébastiani stationed at Málaga. The corps numbered some 10,000 men located in southern Andalusia to prevent the Spanish partisans from receiving arms from Gibraltar.

In the autumn of 1810, British Major General Lord Blayney decided to lead an expeditionary force from Gibraltar towards the port of Málaga and seize it by surprise. The beaches near the small fortress of Fuengirola seemed a perfect landing place for his forces. The Spanish partisans informed the British about the weakness of the defenders and lack of reserves. In October 1810, Blayney gathered a field force of 2/89th Regiment of Foot, a battalion of international deserters from the French army, an artillery unit, naval gun crews and a Spanish Toledo Regiment. The initial British-Spanish expedition numbered some 1700 men, excluding naval staff and crew. They boarded a small fleet consisting of two frigates, (HMS Topaze and HMS Sparrowhawk), five gunboats, several brigs, and transport sloops.

Battle 
On 14 October 1810 the British force reached Cala Moral Bay, about two miles southwest from Fuengirola. The British disembarked, and were joined on the beach by a small number of Spanish partisans. Blayney led his force northeast along the shore while his fleet sailed parallel toward Fuengirola. At 2:00 pm they all arrived in front of the castle and the British general sent an emissary to convince the Polish commander to surrender. Młokosiewicz refused and the British ships opened fire.

Despite numerical inferiority, the Poles held out. Sergeant Zakrzewski even managed to sink one of the British gunboats. The remaining gunboats withdrew out of the range of the two lightweight Polish guns. Under the cover of gunfire from his two frigates, Blayney attempted a frontal attack on the castle walls. However, after Major Grant, the commander of 2/89th Regiment of Foot was killed, Blayney ordered a retreat. Overnight, he landed his guns and the British engineers built two artillery emplacements near the castle, from which they planned to destroy the walls. In the meantime, the Polish garrison of Mijas under Lieutenant Chełmicki, alarmed by the artillery bombardment, sneaked through the British lines and joined up with the defenders. Bronisz's garrison at Alhaurin was also alarmed and in the early morning of 15 October it marched to Mijas, where it clashed with a 450-strong Spanish-German unit sent there by Blayney, dispersing it in a bayonet charge.

On the morning of 15 October the artillery bombardment became heavy and the British cannons destroyed one of the castle towers. Around 2:00 pm, HMS Rodney and a similar Spanish warship arrived at Fuengirola bringing 932 men of the 1/82nd Regiment of Foot. To counter the threat, Captain Młokosiewicz decided to carry out a surprise attack on the enemy artillery positions. Leaving the castle guarded mostly by the wounded, he led the remaining 130 soldiers in a sally. The besiegers were taken by surprise and, despite huge numerical superiority (approximately 10:1), the Spanish regiment protecting the hill artillery redoubt retreated in disorder. The guns were turned away from the castle and the Polish infantrymen started shelling the British positions. Although the artillery fire mostly missed its targets (there were no trained artillery officers in the Polish unit), it made the regrouping of British troops much more difficult.

After about half an hour, Blayney managed to reorganise his troops on the beach and ordered the assault of the artillery emplacement occupied by Polish forces. The outnumbered defenders blew up the gunpowder supplies and withdrew towards the castle. However, before the British and Spanish forces could push any further, they were attacked on their left flank by the Polish garrison of Alhaurin that had just arrived on the battlefield. Approximately 200 rested and well-equipped Poles under Bronisz distracted the British long enough to let the withdrawing Captain Młokosiewicz regroup his force and strike the right flank of the British line. This near-simultaneous attack of Polish units, supported by approximately 30 French cavalrymen from the 21st Dragoon Regiment, surprised the enemy infantry, which soon began to waver. After Blayney was taken prisoner by the Poles, his infantry sounded retreat and started a chaotic re-embarcation under the fire of their own, captured once more, guns.

Aftermath 
The heroic defence of the castle in Fuengirola was one of the few times in history (other than Maida and Albuera), in which Polish soldiers fought against the forces of Great Britain. It was also one of the few decisive British defeats in the Peninsular War. Although, in his memoirs, Blayney tried to downplay the importance of the battle of Fuengirola, he himself remained in French captivity for nearly four years, until 1814. His surrendered sabre is currently on exhibition at the Czartoryski Museum in Kraków (Cracow).

Some British military historians have blamed the British debacle on the timely arrival of General Sébastiani's superior relief force from Málaga. However, Sébastiani's own report to Marshal Soult attests that his column reached Fuengirola on the morning of 16 October, some time after the fight. That debate, nevertheless, continues. (See, for example, Juan Antonio Martín Ruiz's Breve historia de Fuengirola, Editorial Sarriá, 2000, pp. 62–63.)

Notes

References

Further reading

External links
 Battle of Fuengirola, detailed account
 Andrew, 11th Lord of Blayney
 Portrait of Eustachy Chełmicki
 

Battle of Fuengirola
Battles of the Peninsular War
Battles involving Poland
Battles involving Spain
Battles involving the United Kingdom
Battle of Fuengirola
Battle
History of the province of Málaga